Denmark–Spain relations are foreign relations between Denmark and Spain. Relations between Spain and Denmark are determined largely by the membership of both countries to the EU and NATO. Denmark has an embassy in Madrid. Spain has an embassy in Copenhagen.

Trade
Spain is Denmark's 9th largest export country. In 2009, the export to Spain was more than 13 billion DKK. Danish export to Spain includes medicine, industrial machinery and furnitures.

Embassies 

The Embassy of Denmark is located in Madrid, Spain. The Embassy of Spain is located in Copenhagen, Denmark.

See also
 Foreign relations of Denmark 
 Foreign relations of Spain

References

External links
 Tax treaty
 Agreement concerning international road transport Initialled on 6 April 1972, and signed at Copenhagen on 12 June 1974

 
Spain
Bilateral relations of Spain